Biomass to liquid (BtL or BMtL) is a multi-step process of producing synthetic hydrocarbon fuels made from biomass via a thermochemical route.

Main processes
According to a study done by the U.S. Department of Agriculture and the Department of Energy, the United States can produce at least 1.3 billion tons of cellulosic biomass each year without decreasing the amount of biomass needed for our food, animal feed, or exports.

Fischer–Tropsch process
The Fischer–Tropsch process is used to produce synfuels from gasified biomass. Carbonaceous material is gasified and the gas is processed to make purified syngas (a mixture of carbon monoxide and hydrogen). The Fischer–Tropsch polymerizes syngas into diesel-range hydrocarbons. While biodiesel and bio-ethanol production so far only use parts of a plant, i.e. oil, sugar, starch or cellulose, BtL production can gasify and utilize the entire plant.

Flash pyrolysis
Flash pyrolysis—producing bio-oil (pyrolysis oil), char and gas at temperatures between 350–550 °C and residence times < 1 second (also called anhydrous pyrolysis).

Catalytic fast pyrolysis 
Catalytic fast pyrolysis is a fast process in which the cellulose is broken down to a liquid biofuel. In this approach the cellulose is heated to 500 degrees Celsius in less than one second in a chamber to break apart the molecules. The catalyst forms chemical reactions that remove oxygen bonds and form carbon rings. After the reaction takes place gasoline is formed along with water, carbon dioxide, and carbon monoxide.

Pyrolysis and gasification
Initially biomass undergoes pyrolysis process to produce pyrolysis gases and biochar. The volatile organic compounds in pyrolysis gases further undergo gasification process to produce syngas rich in hydrogen and carbon monoxide gases which is further converted in to methanol (CH3OH). The carbon neutral biochar is further converted in to ethylene or ethanol with hydrogen generated from renewable electricity or used for carbon sequestration to reduce global warming CO2 gas in the atmosphere.

AFEX treatment 
In the Ammonia Fiber Expansion / Explosion (AFEX) pre-treat process, hot concentrated 15 M ammonia is used to break down sugar molecules, cellulose and hemicellulose significantly more efficiently than enzymes. The result is minor biomass degradation with high yields.  AFEX is generally done in one step, making it more efficient than other processes.

Catalytic depolymerization
Catalytic depolymerization is the use of heat and catalysts to separate usable diesel fuel from hydrocarbon wastes.

Regional Biomass Processing Center 
Regional Biomass Processing Center is a conceptual place where the AFEX treated biomass can go to biorefineries, farms and forests, and animal feeders. This will improve the value of cellulosic biomass for animals and biofuel production. This will reduce the density of the biomass for easier transport, simplify contract issues, and increase the land use for biofuels

The process uses the whole plant to improve the carbon dioxide balance and increase yield.

Potential energy grasses
Fuel from energy grasses may be referred to as grassoline.

Switchgrass 
Switchgrass is a bunch grass native to North America that grows naturally in warm weather with wide adaptation capability and easy germination, allowing the switchgrass to grow faster; however, it has a low relative yield compared to other energy crops

Sorghum 
Sorghum is cultivated in warmer climates, mostly in the tropical regions. Sorghum has the potential to be an energy grass because it requires little water and can give a large yield. Sorghum, however, is an annual plant, is difficult to establish in an area, and requires a large input of fertilizers and pesticides.

Miscanthus 
Miscanthus species are native to the tropical regions of Africa and southern Asia. Miscanthus can grow up to 3.5 meters high and has been trialed as a biofuel since the 1980s. The benefits of using Miscanthus are that it can live more than two years and requires low inputs, eliminating the need for extra irrigation, fertilizer and pesticides. The problems with Miscanthus arise from the time it takes to establish to an area.

Sugarcane
Sugarcane grows in irrigated lands of tropics and subtropics which can produce 15 kg biomass per square meter area. It is also suitable for BtL as its extracted juice is used to produce ethanol by traditional methods and also its remaining biomass (bagasse, leaves, shoots, etc) can be converted in to carbon neutral ethanol or methanol by subjecting to pyrolysis and gasification. Biochar can also be produced for carbon sequestration to compensate the carbon emissions by fossil fuels or reduce CO2 gas concentration in the atmosphere.

Bamboo 
Bamboo is one of the fastest growing plant/biomass which can be used as feed stock for BtL. Most bamboo species are native to warm and moist tropical and to warm temperate climates. However, many species are found in diverse climates, ranging from hot tropical regions to cool mountainous regions and highland cloud forests.

Cost of change 
Fuel costs depend on how fast the grasses grow and other factors. An estimated investment of over $325 billion (2008 basis) would be needed to build biofactories capable of producing the 65 billion gallons of biofuel needed to meet 2030 national goals.

See also

Bioconversion of biomass to mixed alcohol fuels
Bioenergy
Biofuel
Bioliquids
Biomass
Biomass gasification
Biomass heating systems
Bioproduct
Biorefinery
DMF fuel
Gas to liquid
Cellulosic ethanol
Coal to liquid
Gasification
NExBTL—despite the name BtL, the feedstock is plant oil, not whole plants.
Non-food crops
Renewable energy
Sustainable energy
Synthetic fuel
Thermal depolymerization
Wood fuel

References

External links
 EUROBIOREF : European Multilevel Integrated Biorefinery Design for Sustainable Biomass Processing
 SWAFEA : Sustainable Way for Alternative Fuels and Energy for Aviation
 "Synthetic Diesel May Play a Significant Role as Renewable Fuel in Germany" at USDA FAS website
 Enzymatic Hydrolysis at DOE EERE website
 NSF article on the work of Huber and others towards plant based fuel

Biomass
Synthetic fuel technologies
Fuel production